Helen Elliott (born 19 September 1949) is a Filipino former swimmer. She competed in four events at the 1968 Summer Olympics.

References

1949 births
Living people
Filipino female swimmers
Olympic swimmers of the Philippines
Swimmers at the 1968 Summer Olympics
Sportspeople from Manila
Asian Games medalists in swimming
Asian Games silver medalists for the Philippines
Swimmers at the 1966 Asian Games
Medalists at the 1966 Asian Games